800 (eight hundred) is the natural number following 799 and preceding 801.

It is the sum of four consecutive primes (193 + 197 + 199 + 211). It is a Harshad number, an Achilles number and the area of a square with diagonal 40.

Integers from 801 to 899

800s

 801 = 32 × 89, Harshad number, number of clubs patterns appearing in 50 × 50 coins
 802 = 2 × 401, sum of eight consecutive primes (83 + 89 + 97 + 101 + 103 + 107 + 109 + 113), nontotient, happy number, sum of 4 consecutive triangular numbers (171 + 190 + 210 + 231)
 803 = 11 × 73, sum of three consecutive primes (263 + 269 + 271), sum of nine consecutive primes (71 + 73 + 79 + 83 + 89 + 97 + 101 + 103 + 107), Harshad number, number of partitions of 34 into Fibonacci parts
 804 = 22 × 3 × 67, nontotient, Harshad number, refactorable number
 "The 804" is a local nickname for the Greater Richmond Region of the U.S. state of Virginia, derived from its telephone area code (although the area code covers a larger area).
 805 = 5 × 7 × 23, sphenic number, number of partitions of 38 into nonprime parts
 806 = 2 × 13 × 31, sphenic number, nontotient, totient sum for first 51 integers, happy number, Phi(51)
 807 = 3 × 269, antisigma(42)
 808 = 23 × 101, refactorable number, strobogrammatic number
 809 = prime number, Sophie Germain prime, Chen prime, Eisenstein prime with no imaginary part

810s
 810 = 2 × 34 × 5, Harshad number, number of distinct reduced words of length 5 in the Coxeter group of "Apollonian reflections" in three dimensions, number of different ways in which 100,000 can be expressed as the sum of two prime numbers
 811 = prime number, sum of five consecutive primes (151 + 157 + 163 + 167 + 173), Chen prime, happy number, largest minimal prime in base 9, the Mertens function of 811 returns 0
 812 = 22 × 7 × 29, admirable number, pronic number, balanced number, the Mertens function of 812 returns 0
 813 = 3 × 271, blum integer 
 814 = 2 × 11 × 37, sphenic number, the Mertens function of 814 returns 0, nontotient, number of fixed hexahexes.
 815 = 5 × 163, number of graphs with 8 vertices and a distinguished bipartite block
 816 = 24 × 3 × 17, tetrahedral number, Padovan number, Zuckerman number
 817 = 19 × 43, sum of three consecutive primes (269 + 271 + 277), centered hexagonal number
 818 = 2 × 409, nontotient, strobogrammatic number
 819 = 32 × 7 × 13, square pyramidal number

820s
 820 = 22 × 5 × 41, triangular number, smallest triangular number that starts with the digit 8 Harshad number, happy number, repdigit (1111) in base 9
 821 = prime number, twin prime, Chen prime, Eisenstein prime with no imaginary part, lazy caterer number , prime quadruplet with 823, 827, 829
 822 = 2 × 3 × 137, sum of twelve consecutive primes (43 + 47 + 53 + 59 + 61 + 67 + 71 + 73 + 79 + 83 + 89 + 97), sphenic number, member of the Mian–Chowla sequence
 823 = prime number, twin prime, lucky prime, the Mertens function of 823 returns 0, prime quadruplet with 821, 827, 829
 824 = 23 × 103, refactorable number, sum of ten consecutive primes (61 + 67 + 71 + 73 + 79 + 83 + 89 + 97 + 101 + 103), the Mertens function of 824 returns 0, nontotient
 825 = 3 × 52 × 11, Smith number, the Mertens function of 825 returns 0, Harshad number
 826 = 2 × 7 × 59, sphenic number, number of partitions of 29 into parts each of which is used a different number of times
 827 = prime number, twin prime, part of prime quadruplet with {821, 823, 829}, sum of seven consecutive primes (103 + 107 + 109 + 113 + 127 + 131 + 137), Chen prime, Eisenstein prime with no imaginary part, strictly non-palindromic number
 828 = 22 × 32 × 23, Harshad number, triangular matchstick number
 829 = prime number, twin prime, part of prime quadruplet with {827, 823, 821}, sum of three consecutive primes (271 + 277 + 281), Chen prime, centered triangular number

830s
 830 = 2 × 5 × 83, sphenic number, sum of four consecutive primes (197 + 199 + 211 + 223), nontotient, totient sum for first 52 integers
 831 = 3 × 277, number of partitions of 32 into at most 5 parts
 832 = 26 × 13, Harshad number, member of the sequence Horadam(0, 1, 4, 2)
 833 = 72 × 17, octagonal number , a centered octahedral number
 834 = 2 × 3 × 139, cake number, sphenic number, sum of six consecutive primes (127 + 131 + 137 + 139 + 149 + 151), nontotient
 835 = 5 × 167, Motzkin number

 836 = 22 × 11 × 19, weird number
 837 = 33 × 31, the 36th generalized heptagonal number
 838 = 2 × 419, palindromic number, number of distinct products ijk with 1 <= i<j<k <= 23
 839 = prime number, safe prime, sum of five consecutive primes (157 + 163 + 167 + 173 + 179), Chen prime, Eisenstein prime with no imaginary part, highly cototient number

840s

 840 = 23 × 3 × 5 × 7, highly composite number, smallest number divisible by the numbers 1 to 8 (lowest common multiple of 1 to 8), sparsely totient number, Harshad number in base 2 through base 10, idoneal number, balanced number, sum of a twin prime (419 + 421). With 32 distinct divisors, it is the number below 1000 with the largest amount of divisors. 
 841 = 292 = 202 + 212, sum of three consecutive primes (277 + 281 + 283), sum of nine consecutive primes (73 + 79 + 83 + 89 + 97 + 101 + 103 + 107 + 109), centered square number, centered heptagonal number, centered octagonal number
 842 = 2 × 421, nontotient, 842!! - 1 is prime, number of series-reduced trees with 18 nodes
 843 = 3 × 281, Lucas number
 844 = 22 × 211, nontotient, smallest 5 consecutive integers which are not squarefree are: 844 = 22 × 211, 845 = 5 × 132, 846 = 2 × 32 × 47, 847 = 7 × 112 and 848 = 24 × 53 
 845 = 5 × 132, concentric pentagonal number, number of emergent parts in all partitions of 22 
 846 = 2 × 32 × 47, sum of eight consecutive primes (89 + 97 + 101 + 103 + 107 + 109 + 113 + 127), nontotient, Harshad number
 847 = 7 × 112, happy number, number of partitions of 29 that do not contain 1 as a part
 848 = 24 × 53, untouchable number
 849 = 3 × 283, the Mertens function of 849 returns 0, blum integer

850s
 850 = 2 × 52 × 17, the Mertens function of 850 returns 0, nontotient, the sum of the squares of the divisors of 26 is 850 . The maximum possible Fair Isaac credit score, country calling code for North Korea
 851 = 23 × 37, number of compositions of 18 into distinct parts
 852 = 22 × 3 × 71, pentagonal number, Smith number
 country calling code for Hong Kong
 853 = prime number, Perrin number, the Mertens function of 853 returns 0, average of first 853 prime numbers is an integer , strictly non-palindromic number, number of connected graphs with 7 nodes
 country calling code for Macau
 854 = 2 × 7 × 61, sphenic number, nontotient, number of unlabeled planar trees with 11 nodes
 855 = 32 × 5 × 19, decagonal number, centered cube number
 country calling code for Cambodia
 856 = 23 × 107, nonagonal number, centered pentagonal number, happy number, refactorable number
 country calling code for Laos
 857 = prime number, sum of three consecutive primes (281 + 283 + 293), Chen prime, Eisenstein prime with no imaginary part
 858 = 2 × 3 × 11 × 13, Giuga number
 859 = prime number, number of planar partitions of 11, prime index prime

860s
 860 = 22 × 5 × 43, sum of four consecutive primes (199 + 211 + 223 + 227), Hoax number
 861 = 3 × 7 × 41, sphenic number, triangular number, hexagonal number, Smith number
 862 = 2 × 431, lazy caterer number 
 863 = prime number, safe prime, sum of five consecutive primes (163 + 167 + 173 + 179 + 181), sum of seven consecutive primes (107 + 109 + 113 + 127 + 131 + 137 + 139), Chen prime, Eisenstein prime with no imaginary part, index of prime Lucas number
 864 = 25 × 33, Achilles number, sum of a twin prime (431 + 433), sum of six consecutive primes (131 + 137 + 139 + 149 + 151 + 157), Harshad number
 865 = 5 × 173,
 866 = 2 × 433, nontotient, number of one-sided noniamonds, number of cubes of edge length 1 required to make a hollow cube of edge length 13
 867 = 3 × 172, number of 5-chromatic simple graphs on 8 nodes
 868 = 22 × 7 × 31 = J3(10), nontotient
 869 = 11 × 79, the Mertens function of 869 returns 0

870s
 870 = 2 × 3 × 5 × 29, sum of ten consecutive primes (67 + 71 + 73 + 79 + 83 + 89 + 97 + 101 + 103 + 107), pronic number, nontotient, sparsely totient number, Harshad number
 This number is the magic constant of n×n normal magic square and n-queens problem for n = 12.
 871 = 13 × 67, thirteenth tridecagonal number
 872 = 23 × 109, refactorable number, nontotient, 872! + 1 is prime
 873 = 32 × 97, sum of the first six factorials from 1
 874 = 2 × 19 × 23, sphenic number, sum of the first twenty-three primes, sum of the first seven factorials from 0, nontotient, Harshad number, happy number
 875 = 53 × 7, unique expression as difference of positive cubes: 103 - 53
 876 = 22 × 3 × 73, generalized pentagonal number
 877 = prime number, Bell number, Chen prime, the Mertens function of 877 returns 0, strictly non-palindromic number, prime index prime
 878 = 2 × 439, nontotient, number of Pythagorean triples with hypotenuse < 1000.
 879 = 3 × 293, number of regular hypergraphs spanning 4 vertices, candidate Lychrel seed number

880s

 880 = 24 × 5 × 11 = 11!!!, Harshad number; 148-gonal number; the number of n×n magic squares for n = 4.
 country calling code for Bangladesh

 881 = prime number, twin prime, sum of nine consecutive primes (79 + 83 + 89 + 97 + 101 + 103 + 107 + 109 + 113), Chen prime, Eisenstein prime with no imaginary part, happy number
 882 = 2 × 32 × 72 =  a trinomial coefficient, Harshad number, totient sum for first 53 integers, area of a square with diagonal 42
 883 = prime number, twin prime, sum of three consecutive primes (283 + 293 + 307), the  Mertens function of 883 returns 0
 884 = 22 × 13 × 17, the Mertens function of 884 returns 0, number of points on surface of tetrahedron with sidelength 21
 885 = 3 × 5 × 59, sphenic number, number of series-reduced rooted trees whose leaves are integer partitions whose multiset union is an integer partition of 7.
 886 = 2 × 443, the Mertens function of 886 returns 0
 country calling code for Taiwan
 887 = prime number followed by primal gap of 20, safe prime, Chen prime, Eisenstein prime with no imaginary part

 888 = 23 × 3 × 37, sum of eight consecutive primes (97 + 101 + 103 + 107 + 109 + 113 + 127 + 131), Harshad number, strobogrammatic number, happy number, 888!! - 1 is prime
 889 = 7 × 127, the Mertens function of 889 returns 0

890s
 890 = 2 × 5 × 89 = 192 + 232 (sum of squares of two successive primes), sphenic number, sum of four consecutive primes (211 + 223 + 227 + 229), nontotient
 891 = 34 × 11, sum of five consecutive primes (167 + 173 + 179 + 181 + 191), octahedral number
 892 = 22 × 223, nontotient, number of regions formed by drawing the line segments connecting any two perimeter points of a 6 times 2 grid of squares like this .
 893 = 19 × 47, the Mertens function of 893 returns 0
 Considered an unlucky number in Japan, because its digits read sequentially are the literal translation of yakuza.
 894 = 2 × 3 × 149, sphenic number, nontotient
 895 = 5 × 179, Smith number, Woodall number, the Mertens function of 895 returns 0
 896 = 27 × 7, refactorable number, sum of six consecutive primes (137 + 139 + 149 + 151 + 157 + 163), the Mertens function of 896 returns 0
 897 = 3 × 13 × 23, sphenic number, cullen number 
 898 = 2 × 449, the Mertens function of 898 returns 0, nontotient
 899 = 29 × 31 (a twin prime product), happy number, smallest number with digitsum 26, number of partitions of 51 into prime parts

References

Integers